The Underground is a club/music venue in Hanley, Stoke-on-Trent, England. It was also part of the NME group, Club NME. It is well known for hosting several up and coming indie/rock/metal acts, and many local bands in the Staffordshire area.

Artists 
The Underground is host to many gigs, featuring bands from the local area and also many big name bands and DJs. Probably the most well-remembered gig at the Underground would be the first of many times Pete Doherty's band, Babyshambles performed. The gig ended in an impromptu car top sing-along led by Doherty and former Libertines bandmate Carl Barat, the incident referred to as The Babyshambles riot was covered heavily in the music press, and gave the club immediate cult status.

The Underground hosted a sold out acoustic set by Pete Doherty on 11 February 2009, then again on 30 May that year.

Bands that have played at the Stoke Underground include acts such as:

 Architects
 Arthur Lee & Love
 Babyshambles
 Big Narstie
 Bring Me the Horizon
 Crystal Castles
 Datarock
 Devil Sold His Soul
 Discharge
 Editors
 Exit Ten
 Fozzy
 Gallows (DJ set)
 Har Mar Superstar
 Hard-Fi
 Hadouken!
 The Holloways
 John Cale
 Klaxons
 Lethal Bizzle
 Lower Than Atlantis
 Milburn
 The Others
 The Paddingtons
 The Pipettes
 The Wombats
 Misfits
 Municipal Waste
 Mystery Jets
 Neck Deep
 Parkway Drive
 The Red Chord
 The Rumble Strips
 Sick of It All
 Stray from the Path
 U.K. Subs
 Walls of Jericho
 We Are Scientists

References

External links 
Myspace page

Buildings and structures in Stoke-on-Trent
Music venues in Staffordshire